The women's competition in 75 kg division was staged on September 25–26, 2007.

Schedule

Medalists

Records

Results

New records

References
Results 

Women's 76
World